James Rushmore Wood (September 14, 1816 – May 4, 1882), born in Mamaroneck, New York, was an American surgeon and one of the founders of Bellevue Hospital Medical College in New York City.  He retired from his university duties in 1868.

Descendants 
 A grandson of the same name, wed to Katherine Lawrence Wickham, was a soldier during World War I.

References

External links 
 
 Portrait photograph from the Ehrman Medical Library Archives

1816 births
1882 deaths
Physicians from New York City
People from Mamaroneck, New York